Haploembia solieri or bicolored webspinner is a species of webspinner in the family Oligotomidae. It is found in Europe, Northern Asia (excluding China), and North America. Unlike Haploembia tarsalis, which reproduces asexually, H. solieri reproduces sexually. Adult specimens of H. solieri are orange and black and around 11 mm long.

References

Further reading

External links

 

Embioptera
Insects described in 1842